Kadhi, or karhi, is a popular dish mainly consumed in South Asia. It consists of a thick gravy or soup based on gram flour, and it may contain vegetable fritters called pakora, which include dahi (yogurt) for a sour taste. It is often eaten with cooked rice or roti. Varieties of kadhi include those from Rajasthan, Maharashtra, Gujarat, Punjab, and Sindh, all of which are located in present-day India and Pakistan.

India
Kadhi is generally considered a staple everyday food in many parts of India and is thought to aid in digestion. In Gujarat and Rajasthan, it is usually served with khichdi, roti, paratha, or rice. Gujarati and Rajasthani kadhi differ from the Uttar Pradesh variety. Gujarati kadhi is a little sweeter than the other variants because sugar or jaggery is added to it, but it can be made without sugar for a more sour taste. It is eaten without pakoras, and its consistency is slightly thinner. Gujarati kadhi may be made from buttermilk, which gives it a smoother texture compared to yogurt. Variations of this basic dish include the addition of certain vegetables, notably bhindi (okra); kadhi containing okra is known as bhinda ni kadhi. In Punjab, kadhi is a simple and quick winter meal. Unlike the rest of India, yogurt is not added — full-fat buttermilk is used instead. Depending on the region, kadhi is commonly tempered with red chili peppers, cumin, coriander seeds, asafoetida, and fenugreek seeds.

In Western India, especially in coastal Maharashtra and in the Konkan region, kadhi is made with kokum, creating a varient called solkadhi. Other variants of kadhi in Maharashtra are made with kacchi kairi (raw mango), which is known as aambyachi kadhi (raw mango kadhi). Another variant of kadhi in Maharashtra is made with curd and buttermilk; this is known as takachi kadhi.

In Haryana, a popular variation is called haryanvi hara choley kadhi, made with besan and hare choley (raw green chickpeas) plus pure ghee, which is added during serving. Haryanvi kadhi is sometimes cooked with additional ingredients, such as seasonal farm-fresh green bathua leaves or kachri, a kind of small, wild melon.

In Purvanchal (eastern Uttar Pradesh) and Bihar, it is called kadhi-badi because of the addition of pakoras, small badi (or vadi) made out of chickpea flour, with no vegetables added (unlike standard pakora). 

The name kadhi is also derived from several Indo-Aryan languages spoken in northern India, in which काढ़ना kadhna means 'to take out,' which, in this context , means to reduce, so the yogurt and chickpea curry is cooked for a very long time until it is reduced and the consistency changes from runny to thick and creamy.

In Southern states, it is seasoned with sauteed asafoetida, mustard seeds, cumin, and fenugreek. The soup is thickened in a different way by the addition of pureed split chickpeas soaked overnight with whole coriander seeds and dry red chili pepper. Squash, okra, tomato, Chinese spinach, carrots, and sweet peas are some of the vegetables that are added to the seasoning before bringing the soup to a boil. Pakoras (gram flour fritters) are added for special occasions like ceremonies. It is called majjige huli in Kannada, majjiga pulusu in Telugu, and mor kuzhambu in Tamil; all of these names have similar meanings. In Kerala, it is called kaalan.

The Sindhi diaspora in India usually make kadhi by roasting the chickpea flour and adding vegetables to the chickpea gravy. It is called kadhi because of the use of curry leaves, which are called kadhi patta in Sindhi. Instead of yogurt, tamarind pulp is used to give it a sour taste. An alternate method is to make a liquid mixture of chickpea flour instead of roasting chickpeas.

Pakistan

In Pakistan, kadhi is usually served with steamed rice and naan. Thari people commonly refer to kadhi as raabro or khaatiyo.

In Northern Pakistan, in and around the Hazara region of Khyber Pakhtunkhwa province, kadhi can be prepared with a variety of additives such as chicken, pumpkin, and sarson ka saag.

In Karachi and Hyderabad, Sindh, in addition to plain kadhi, a variety of vegetables such as okra, aubergine, and drumstick beans may be added. In Pakistan, kadhi is generally understood to always include fritters.

See also

 Kadhi-Churma
 Kadhi chawal
 Gujarati kadhi
 List of Indian dishes
 List of soups
 List of stews

References

External links

Sindhi kadhi
Gujarati kadhi
Rajasthani kadhi
Punjabi kadhi

Indian soups and stews
Pakistani soups and stews
Indian cuisine
North Indian cuisine
Rajasthani cuisine
Gujarati cuisine
Sindhi cuisine
Punjabi cuisine
Chickpea dishes
Kutchi cuisine
Yogurt-based dishes